Mycterops is a genus of prehistoric eurypterid of the family Mycteroptidae. Mycterops lived during the Carboniferous period in Europe and North America.

Description
Mycteroptids were medium-sized to fairly large.  Their outer surface had numerous scales and reticulate ornamentation. Their first and possibly second tergites (dorsal surfaces of the abdominal sections) were strongly developed.  Their legs resembled those of Stylonurus.  The prosoma (head) was subtrapezoid, with small compound eyes.

Classification
The three genera included in the Mycteroptidae -  Mycterops, Woodwardopterus, and Megarachne - might represent different ontogenetic stages of each other based on the sizes of the referred specimens and the patterns of mucronation. This would sink the genera Woodwardopterus and Megarachne into Mycterops.

Mycterops whitei is a fragmentary species that might not be referrable to the genus at all if more complete specimens show that it has a caudal postabdomen.

Species 
The species currently seen as valid species of the genus are:
 Mycterops? blairi Waterston, 1968 — Carboniferous, Scotland.
 Mycterops matthieui Pruvost, 1924 — Carboniferous, Belgium.
 Mycterops ordinatus Cope, 1886 — Carboniferous, Pennsylvania (United States).
 Mycterops? whitei Schram, 1984 — Carboniferous, Iowa (United States).

See also

 List of eurypterids

References

Carboniferous eurypterids
Stylonurina
Carboniferous arthropods of Europe
Eurypterids of Europe